Newton's leaf-toed gecko (Hemidactylus newtoni) is a species of lizard in the family Gekkonidae.

Etymology
The specific name, newtoni, is in honor of Portuguese botanist Colonel Francesco Newton.

Geographic range
H. newtoni is endemic to the island of Annobón in Equatorial Guinea.

Reproduction
H. newtoni is oviparous.

Taxonomy
H. newtoni was described and named by Júlio Bethencourt Ferreira in 1897.

References

Further reading
Ferreira, J. Bethencourt (1897). "Sobre um Hemidactylus novo da ilha de Anno Bom ". Jornal de Sciencias, Mathematicas, Physicas e Naturaes, Academia Real das Sciencias de Lisboa, Segunda Série 4: 249–251. (Hemidactylus newtoni, new species). (in Portuguese).

newtoni
Endemic fauna of Annobón
Reptiles of Equatorial Guinea
Reptiles described in 1897